The 1992 World Series of Poker (WSOP) was a series of poker tournaments held at Binion's Horseshoe.

Preliminary events

Main Event

There were 201 entrants to the main event. Each paid $10,000 to enter the tournament. Until the 2007 WSOP Main Event, this was the only year that there were fewer participants in the main event than the prior year.

Final table

Other High Finishes

NB: This list is restricted to top 30 finishers with an existing Wikipedia entry.

References

World Series of Poker
World Series of Poker